Jjhoom India is a musical reality show that aired on Sahara One channel, starting from 27 October 2007. Jjhoom India is an Indian adaptation of Stars on Stage, a Swedish format from Zodiac Television.

Concept
Jjhoom India is a musical reality show wherein ten celebrities are paired with professional singers to take on specific challenges. The ten celebrities team up with singers to compete against each other for the grand prize. The singers train their celebrity partner, and the duo performs on the stage. Each week, the pairs have to perform a song based on specific themes: Disco, Swinging Sixties, R.D. Burman special, etc. One pair is eliminated every week. Viewers get a chance to vote for the best three teams every week.

Host/Anchor
Rahul Vaidya
Sucheta Khanna

Judges
Mahesh Bhatt 
Shabana Azmi 
Anand Shah

Winners
Sachin Tyagi and Madhushree

Finalists
Varun Badola and Akriti Kakar

Contestants
Jodi 1 - Vinod Rathod and Roshni Chopra
Jodi 2 - Jatin Padit and Chhavi Mittal
Jodi 3 - Varun Badola and Akriti Kakar
Jodi 4 - Jolly Mukherjee and Shama Sikander
Jodi 5 - Sharad Kelker and Vaishali Samant 
Jodi 6 - Parthiv Gohil and Apara Mehta
Jodi 7 - Sachin Tyagi and Madhushree  
Jodi 8 - Shekhar Suman and Sanjeevni
Jodi 9 - Sudesh Bhosle and Mrinal Kulkarni
Jodi 10- Suresh Wadkarr and Shweta Tiwari

References

External links 
Jjhoom India Official Site

Singing talent shows
Sahara One original programming
Indian reality television series
Music competitions in India
Indian television series based on non-Indian television series
Television series by Optimystix Entertainment
2007 Indian television series debuts
2008 Indian television series endings